The National Pension Service of Korea (NPS) is a public pension fund in South Korea. It is the third largest in the world with $800 billion in assets, and is the largest investor in South Korea.

South Korea's National Pension Service (NPS), which oversees $800 billion in assets, is looking to buy a portfolio of blue-chip stocks from emerging markets.

On January 30, 2017, NPS opened up an office in New York City's One Vanderbilt.

The National Pension Service announced on 27 January 2023 that it expects the pension fund to run out of money by 2055.

Timeline 

 December, 1986 – Promulgated the Nation Pension Act
 September, 1987 – Established the National Pension Corporation
 January, 1988 – Implemented the national pension system (Limited to workplaces with 10 or more full-time employees)
 January, 1992 – Compulsory coverage included workplaces with five or more full-time employees
 January, 1993 – Commenced Special Old-age Pension benefit payment
 April, 1995 – Established the National Pension Research Institute
 July, 1995 – Compulsory coverage was extended to farmers and fishermen in rural areas
 August, 1995 – Compulsory coverage was extended to workplace-based foreigners
 April, 1999 – Compulsory coverage expanded to majority population in Korea (compulsory coverage in urban areas)
 November, 1999 – Launched the National Pension Fund Management Center
 July, 2003~2006 – Gradually expanded compulsory coverage to corporations and workplaces with less than five full-time employees
 July, 2007 – Renamed as the "National Pension Service"
 May, 2009 – Commenced the Retirement Planning Service
 May, 2009 – Launched NPS International Service Center
 January, 2011 – Established NPS International Center (Integrated the former International Cooperation Department and the NPS International Service Center)
 January, 2011 – Consigned the affairs in relation to collection of contribution to the National Health Insurance Service (NHIS)
 April, 2011 – Implemented a system for assessment and registration of the disabled (all levels), in accordance with the Welfare of Disabled Persons Act
 October, 2011 – Commenced support programs for the disabled
 December, 2012 – Determined the scope of income of an insured under the National Basic Living Security Act
 July, 2014 – Support for the Basic Pension operation
 January, 2015 – NPS headquarters relocation to Jeonju
 December, 2015 – Implementation of Retirement Planning Service
 February, 2017 – NPSIM relocation to Jeonju

Notes

External links
National Pension Service(In English)

Companies based in Seoul
Financial services companies of South Korea
Sovereign wealth funds
Government-owned companies of South Korea
1987 establishments in South Korea
Public pension funds